This is a list of works associated with the left-handed Austrian pianist Paul Wittgenstein.

These works were either: 
 arranged for left hand by him (A)
 commissioned by him (C)
 dedicated to him or written with him in mind (D), or
 premiered by him (P).

References

Compositions for piano left-hand
 
Wittgenstein